The National Institute of Concessions, INCO, was a Colombian government agency in charge of funding the planning and execution of road, river, sea, rail and port transportation projects in the country. It was dissolved and replaced by the National Infrastructure Agency in 2011.

References

Government agencies established in 2003
Government agencies disestablished in 2011
Ministry of Transport (Colombia)